The New Empire cinema is a cinema in Bowral, New South Wales. Open since 1915, it is the oldest continuously running cinema in mainland Australia.

The New Empire has four screens, and can hold up to 560 people. The cinema is run by Richard Ruhfus, David Graham and Gerard Aiken, and a staff of 24 employees.

External links
 

Cinemas in New South Wales
Bowral